Leggatt Island is part of the Great Barrier Reef Marine Park and the easternmost island in the Cole Islands group and National Park and is about 100 km south-east of Cape Melville, Queensland.

Leggatt Island is a vegetated sand cay located 15 km from the coast, well established with coconut palms and sisal that provide a habitat for a number of roosting birds and green turtles and hawksbill turtles.

This island is used by a number of tour operators.

Islands on the Great Barrier Reef
Uninhabited islands of Australia
Islands of Far North Queensland
Great Barrier Reef Marine Park